is a 1986 side-scrolling platform video game for the Nintendo Entertainment System, NEC PC-8801, and TRS-80 Color Computer 3 published under Activision's license. Despite the title screen stating that it was developed by Pony Inc, the actual development of the NES version was handled by Micronics, with the PC-8801 version being developed by Pony Inc. while the CoCo version is credited as being "Programmed by Steve Bjork of SRB Software". The PC-8801 version released in November 1986, two months after the original release in September 1986, although this variant of the game was limited to single-screen platforming rather than side-scrolling.

In addition to being a new entry in Activision's Pitfall series, Super Pitfall was the first game that Activision published as a third-party developer for the NES. A localized version of Sunsoft's Famicom title Atlantis no Nazo was planned for release as Super Pitfall II, but was cancelled.

Gameplay

Super Pitfall is a loose remake of Pitfall II: Lost Caverns, in that the object is to move Harry through the mazes to find the Raj diamond, and rescue his niece Rhonda and sidekick Quickclaw, both of whom have become lost in the caverns. However, Pitfall Harry's quest becomes tougher when he sees that the faithful Quickclaw is imprisoned in a cage and a key must be found – at which point Pitfall Harry finds that Rhonda has been turned to stone; it is here where he must locate a magic potion that will turn her back into a normal girl.

The difference in Super Pitfall, however, is that Harry must also return to his starting point after accomplishing these objectives. Like the original Pitfall, but unlike Pitfall II: Lost Caverns, Harry has a limited number of lives. This time, Harry is also equipped with a gun with which he can shoot the various deadly creatures that inhabit the caverns, but he has limited ammunition and must find additional bullets scattered throughout the game. Arguably the most difficult enemies to beat are the three cavemen – which require more than one bullet to eliminate. Gathering gold bars results in extra points, which grants extra lives. Completion of this game requires the memorization (or mapping) of numerous hidden keys and warp zones to progress – the likes of which can only be reached by jumping at secret hidden spots in the game's levels. Extra lives, ammo, and other helpful items can also be found by jumping in specific zones.

Critical reception
The NES version was negatively received. A review in Computer Gaming World derided the game as "a [Super Mario Bros.] rehash that most NES users will be able to play in their sleep. Certainly, there is nothing in the game itself to keep them awake." Further complaints were directed at the lack of any credit given to David Crane, the original designer of Pitfall. Brett Alan Weiss of the game database Allgame gave the game a rating of one star out of five, stating that "Pitfall is one of the best Atari 2600 games; Super Pitfall is one of the worst NES games".

References

External links

1986 video games
NEC PC-8801 games
Nintendo Entertainment System games
Pitfall (series)
Platform games
Pony Canyon games
TRS-80 Color Computer games
Video game remakes
Video games developed in Japan